Georg Henrik von Wright (14 June 1916 – 16 June 2003) was a Finnish philosopher.

Biography
G. H. von Wright was born in Helsinki on 14 June 1916 to Tor von Wright and his wife Ragni Elisabeth Alfthan.

On the retirement of Ludwig Wittgenstein as professor at the University of Cambridge in 1948, von Wright was elected to his chair at the age of 32. He published in English, Finnish, German, and Swedish, belonging to the Swedish-speaking minority of Finland. Von Wright was of both Finnish and 17th-century Scottish ancestry, and the family was raised to nobility in 1772.

Work
Von Wright's writings come under two broad categories. The first is analytic philosophy and philosophical logic in the Anglo-American vein. His 1951 texts An Essay in Modal Logic and "Deontic Logic" were landmarks in the postwar rise of formal modal logic and its deontic version. He was an authority on Wittgenstein, editing his later works. He was the leading figure in the Finnish philosophy of his time, specializing in philosophical logic, philosophical analysis, philosophy of action, philosophy of language, philosophy of mind, and the close study of Charles Sanders Peirce.

The other vein in von Wright's writings is moralist and pessimist. During the last twenty years of his life, under the influence of Oswald Spengler, Jürgen Habermas and the Frankfurt School's reflections about modern rationality, he wrote prolifically. His best known article from this period is entitled "The Myth of Progress" (1993), and it questions whether our apparent material and technological progress can really be considered "progress" (see Myth of Progress).

Awards
In the last year of his life, he was awarded several honorary degrees, including one by the University of Bergen. He also was awarded the Swedish Academy Finland Prize in 1968.

Publications 
The Logical Problem of Induction, PhD thesis, 31 May 1941
Den logiska empirismen (Logical Empirism), in Swedish, 1945
Über Wahrscheinlichkeit (On Chance), in German, 1945
An Essay in Modal Logic, (Studies in Logic and the Foundations of Mathematics: Volume V), L.E.J. Brouwer, E.W. Beth, and A. Heyting (eds.), Amsterdam: North-Holland,1951
A Treatise on Induction and Probability, 1951
"Deontic Logic" Mind, 60: 1–15, 1951
Tanke och förkunnelse (Thought and Preaching), in Swedish, 1955
Logical Studies, 1957
Logik, filosofi och språk (Logic, philosophy and language), in Swedish, 1957
The Varieties of Goodness, 1963. (1958–60 Gifford Lectures in the University of St. Andrews. He considered this his best and most personal work.)
Norm and Action, 1963 (1958–60 Gifford Lectures, St. Andrews.)
The Logic of Preference, 1963
Essay om naturen, människan och den vetenskaplig-tekniska revolutionen (Essay on Nature, Man and the Scientific-Technological Revolution), in Swedish, 1963
An Essay in Deontic Logic, 1968
Time, Change and Contradiction, (The Twenty-Second Arthur Stanley Eddington Memorial Lecture Delivered at Cambridge University 1 November 1968) Cambridge University Press. 1969
Tieteen filosofian kaksi perinnettä (The Two Traditions of the Philosophy of Science), in Finnish, 1970
Explanation and Understanding, 1971
Causality and Determinism, 1974
Handlung, Norm und Intention (Action, Norm and Intention), in German, 1977
Humanismen som livshållning (Humanism as an approach to Life), in Swedish, 1978
Freedom and Determination, 1980
Wittgenstein, 1982
Philosophical Papers I–III, 1983–1984
v. I Practical Reason, v. II Philosophical Logic, v. III Truth, Knowledge, and Modality
Of Human Freedom, 1985. (1984 Tanner Lectures at the University of Helsinki)
Filosofisia tutkielmia (Philosophical Dissertations), in Finnish, 1985
Vetenskapen och förnuftet (Science and Reason), in Swedish, 1986
Minervan Pöllö (The Owl of Minerva), in Finnish, 1991
Myten om framsteget (The Myth of Progress), in Swedish, 1993
The Tree of Knowledge and Other Essays, Leiden, Brill.  , 1993
Att förstå sin samtid (To Understand one's own Time), in Swedish, 1994
Six Essays in Philosophical Logic. Acta Philosphica Fennica, Vol. 60, 1996
Viimeisistä ajoista: Ajatusleikki (On the End Times: A Thought Experiment.), in Finnish, 1997
Logiikka ja humanismi (Logic and Humanism), in Finnish, 1998
In the Shadow of Descartes: Essays in the Philosophy of Mind, Dordrech, Kluwer,  1998
Mitt liv som jag minns det (My Life as I Remember it), in Swedish, 2001

Von Wright edited posthumous publications by Wittgenstein, which were published by Blackwell (unless otherwise stated):
 1961. Notebooks 1914-1916.
 1967. Zettel (Translated into English as Culture and Value).
 1969. On Certainty.
 1971. ProtoTractatus—An Early Version of Tractatus Logico-Philosophicus. Cornell University Press.
 1973. Letters to C. K. Ogden with Comments on the English Translation of the Tractatus Logico-Philosophicus.
 1974. Letters to Russell, Keynes and Moore.
 1978 (1956). Remarks on the Foundations of Mathematics.
 1980. Remarks on the Philosophy of Psychology, Vols 1–2.
 1980. Culture and Value (English translation of Zettel).
 1982. Last Writings on the Philosophy of Psychology, Vols. 1–2, 1992.

Von Wright also edited extracts from the diary of David Pinsent, also published by Wiley-Blackwell:
 1990.  A Portrait of Wittgenstein as a Young Man: From the Diary of David Hume Pinsent 1912–1914. .
*For more complete publication details see "Bibliography of the Writings of Georg Henrik von Wright" (in Schilpp, 1989) and "The Georg Henrik von Wright-Bibliography" (2005).

Notes

References

Sources 
 Von Wright Obituary. The Guardian, 4 July 2003.
 G. H. von Wright. Encyclopædia Britannica. (Archived by Wayback Machine.)

Further reading

External links
 "G. H. von Wright" obituary by Brian McGuinness in The Independent, 24 June 2003 (Archived by Wayback Machine)
 Georg Henrik Wright in the National Biography of Finland.
 Georg Henrik von Wright in 375 humanists. Faculty of Arts, University of Helsinki, 13 May 2015.
 

1916 births
2003 deaths
20th-century essayists
20th-century Finnish philosophers
21st-century essayists
21st-century Finnish philosophers
20th-century Finnish nobility
21st-century Finnish nobility
Bertrand Russell Professors of Philosophy
Academic staff of the University of Helsinki
Action theorists
Analytic philosophers
Fellows of the British Academy
Finnish essayists
Finnish humanists
Finnish people of Scottish descent
Finnish writers in Swedish
Logicians
Modal logicians
People from Uusimaa Province (Grand Duchy of Finland)
Philosophers of culture
Philosophers of language
Philosophers of logic
Philosophers of mind
Philosophers of science
Philosophy writers
Selma Lagerlöf Prize winners
University of Helsinki alumni
Virtue ethicists
Writers from Helsinki
Corresponding Fellows of the British Academy
Members of the Royal Swedish Academy of Sciences